Johannes Janssonius (1588, Arnhem – buried July 11, 1664, Amsterdam) (born Jan Janszoon, in English also Jan Jansson) was a Dutch cartographer and publisher who lived and worked in Amsterdam in the 17th century.

Biography

Janssonius was born in Arnhem, the son of Jan Janszoon the Elder, a publisher and bookseller. In 1612 he married Elisabeth de Hondt, the daughter of Jodocus Hondius. He produced his first maps in 1616 of France and Italy. In 1623 Janssonius owned a bookstore in Frankfurt am Main, later also in Danzig, Stockholm, Copenhagen, Berlin, Königsberg, Geneva and Lyon. His wife Elisabeth died in 1627 and he married Elisabeth Carlier in 1629. He formed a partnership with his brother in law Henricus Hondius, and together they published atlases as Mercator/Hondius/Janssonius.

Under the leadership of Janssonius the Hondius Atlas was steadily enlarged. Renamed Atlas Novus, it had three volumes in 1638, one fully dedicated to Italy. In 1646, a fourth volume came out with "English County Maps", a year after a similar issue by Joan Blaeu. Janssonius' maps are similar to those of Blaeu, and he is often accused of copying from his rival, but many of his maps predate those of Blaeu and/or covered different regions. By 1660, at which point the atlas bore the appropriate name "Atlas Major", there were 11 volumes, containing the work of about a hundred credited authors and engravers. It included a description of "most of the cities of the world" (Townatlas), of the waterworld (Atlas Maritimus in 33 maps), and of the Ancient World (60 maps). The eleventh volume was titled Atlas of the Heavens (a type of celestial cartography) by Andreas Cellarius. Editions were printed in Dutch, Latin, French, and a few times in German.

After Janssonius's death, the publishing company was continued by his son-in law, Johannes van Waesbergen. The London bookseller Moses Pitt attempted publication of the Atlas Major in English, but ran out of resources after the fourth volume in 1683.

Selected works

Sueciæ, Norvegiæ et Daniæ Nova Tabula, Amsterdam c. 1645.
Tabula exactissima Regnorum Sueciæ et Norvegiæ (1636), which replaced Hondius II 1613
Episcopatum Stavangriensis, Bergensis et Asloiensis Amsterdam 1636–1642. The first map to show the Oslo Fjord by name. This map shows Southern Norway with the Stavanger bishopric and the adjoining area of the Bergen and Oslo bishoprics.

Literature
 Peter van der Krogt (ed.): Koeman's atlantes Neerlandici, Vol. 1: The folio atlases published by Gerard Mercator, Jodocus Hondius, Henricus Hondius, Johannes Janssonius and their successors, ’t Goy-Houten 1997,

See also
List of cartographers
History of cartography
Willem Blaeu

References

External links 

  
 

17th-century Dutch cartographers
1588 births
1664 deaths
Dutch publishers (people)
People from Arnhem